Hendriktop is a mountain in Suriname at . It is part of the Emma Range and is located in the Sipaliwini District. The mountain is named after Hendrik of the Netherlands. The mountain was first climbed by A. van Stockum in 1902.

References

External links
 Hendriktop at Peak Bagger

Inselbergs of South America
Mountains of Suriname